Goldman Sachs controversies are the controversies surrounding the American multinational investment bank Goldman Sachs.  The bank and its activities have generated substantial controversy and legal issues around the world and is the subject of speculation about its involvement in global finance and politics. In a widely publicized story in Rolling Stone, Matt Taibbi characterized Goldman Sachs as a "great vampire squid" sucking money instead of blood, allegedly engineering "every major market manipulation since the Great Depression."

Role in the financial crisis of 2007–2008 
Goldman has been harshly criticized, particularly in the aftermath of the financial crisis of 2007–2008, where some alleged that it misled its investors and profited from the collapse of the mortgage market. That time — "one of the darkest chapters" in Goldman's history according to The New York Times — brought investigations from the United States Congress, the United States Department of Justice, and a lawsuit from the U.S. Securities and Exchange Commission that resulted in Goldman paying a $550 million settlement. Goldman Sachs was "excoriated by the press and the public" according to journalists McLean and Nocera—this despite the non-retail nature of its business that would normally have kept it out of the public eye. Visibility and antagonism came from the $12.9 billion Goldman received—more than any other firm—from AIG counterparty payments provided by the bailout of AIG, the $10 billion in TARP money it received from the government (though the firm paid this back to the government), and a record $11.4 billion set aside for employee bonuses in the first half of 2009. While all the investment banks were scolded by congressional investigations, Goldman Sachs was subject to "a solo hearing in front of the Senate Permanent Subcommittee on Investigations" and a quite critical report. In a widely publicized story in Rolling Stone, Matt Taibbi characterized Goldman Sachs as a "great vampire squid" sucking money instead of blood, allegedly engineering "every major market manipulation since the Great Depression ... from tech stocks to high gas prices"

Goldman Sachs has denied wrongdoing. It has stated that its customers were aware of its bets against the mortgage-related security products it was selling to them, and that it only used those bets to hedge against losses, and was simply a market maker. The firm also promised a "comprehensive examination of our business standards and practices", more disclosure and better relationships with clients.

Goldman has also been accused of an assortment of other misdeeds, including a general decline in ethical standards, working with dictatorial regimes, cozy relationships with the US federal government via a "revolving door" of former employees, insider trading by some of its traders, and driving up prices of commodities through futures speculation. Goldman has denied wrongdoing in these cases.

Senate report on the causes of the financial crisis of 2007–2008 
On April 14, 2011, the United States Senate's Permanent Subcommittee on Investigations released a 635-page report entitled Wall Street and the Financial Crisis: Anatomy of a Financial Collapse which described some of the causes of the financial crisis. The report alleged that Goldman Sachs may have misled investors and profited from the collapse of the mortgage market at their expense. The Chairman of the Subcommittee referred the report to the United States Department Of Justice to determine whether Goldman executives had broken the law, and two months later the Manhattan district attorney subpoenaed Goldman for relevant information on possible securities fraud, but on August 9 the Justice Department announced it had decided not to file charges against Goldman Sachs or its employees for trades made during the subprime mortgage portfolio.

Stub month and allegedly misleading results in December 2008 
In April 2009, Floyd Norris, chief financial correspondent of the New York Times, accused Goldman Sachs of misleading investors by having "puffed up" its first quarter 2009 earnings by creating a December "orphan month" into which it shifted large write-downs, so they did not appear in any "quarterly number". In April 2009, the company reported a $780 million net loss for the single month of December but reported net earnings of $1.81 billion for the first quarter of 2009.

However, the accounting change to a calendar fiscal year, which created the stub month of December 2008, was required when the firm converted to a bank holding company and declared in Item 5.03 of its Form 8-K U.S. Securities and Exchange Commission (SEC) filing of December 15, 2008. The December loss also included a $850 million mark-to-market write-down on loans to chemical maker LyondellBasell since it became clear in December that Lyondell would file for bankruptcy protection and would not be able to meet its debt obligations.

While the results of December 2008 were detailed in the press release reporting the results of December 2008 and the first quarter of 2009 and the related conference call with analysts, according to an article in the Washington Post by David S. Hilzenrath, "the company included a page of charts in its Monday news release showing its December results, but it didn't include a narrative description of those results as it did for the January-through-March period."

Most financial analysts and the mainstream financial press were aware of the required change in fiscal year and deteriorating market conditions into December and were not surprised by the December loss. Analysts focused more on the first quarter results and the planned repayment of TARP funds, but even Merrill Lynch told its clients not to "forget about December".

Merrill Lynch took at least $8.1 billion of losses in the same period, and Morgan Stanley, which was also required to switch to a calendar year for accounting purposes as a result of its conversion to a bank holding company, also reported a large loss for its stub month of December, although, unlike Goldman, Morgan Stanley also lost money in the first quarter of 2009.

Bonuses paid to employees in 2009 despite financial crisis 
In June 2009, after the firm repaid the TARP investment from the U.S. Treasury, Goldman made some of the largest bonus payments in its history due to its strong financial performance. Andrew Cuomo, then New York Attorney General, questioned Goldman's decision to pay 953 employees bonuses of at least $1 million each after it received TARP funds in 2008. That same period, however, CEO Lloyd Blankfein and 6 other senior executives opted to forgo bonuses, stating they believed it was the right thing to do, in light of "the fact that we are part of an industry that's directly associated with the ongoing economic distress".

Benefits from the government bailout of AIG 
American International Group received $180 billion in government loans during the financial crisis. The money was used to repay customers of its security-lending program and was paid as collateral to counterparties under credit insurance contracts purchased from AIG. However, due to the size and nature of the payouts, there was considerable controversy in the media and amongst some politicians as to whether banks, including Goldman Sachs, should have been forced to take greater losses and should not have been paid in full via government loans to AIG. The New York State Attorney General Andrew Cuomo announced in March 2009 that he was investigating whether AIG's trading counterparties improperly received government money. Goldman Sachs was a major beneficiary of the government loans to AIG and received $12.9 billion during the unwind of credit default swap (CDS) contracts by AIG after receiving the government loans.

Firm's response to criticism of AIG payments 
Goldman Sachs maintained that its net exposure to AIG was 'not material', and that the firm was protected by hedges (in the form of CDSs with other counterparties) and $7.5 billion of collateral. The firm stated the cost of these hedges to be over $100 million. According to Goldman, both the collateral and CDSs would have protected the bank from incurring an economic loss in the event of an AIG bankruptcy (however, because AIG was bailed out and not allowed to fail, these hedges did not pay out). CFO David Viniar stated that profits related to AIG in the first quarter of 2009 "rounded to zero", and profits in December were not significant. He went on to say that he was "mystified" by the interest the government and investors have shown in the bank's trading relationship with AIG.

Considerable speculation remains that Goldman's hedges against its AIG exposure would not have paid out if AIG was allowed to fail. According to a report by the United States Office of the Inspector General of TARP, if AIG had collapsed, it would have made it difficult for Goldman to liquidate its trading positions with AIG, even at discounts, and it also would have put pressure on other counterparties that "might have made it difficult for Goldman Sachs to collect on the credit protection it had purchased against an AIG default." Finally, the report said, an AIG default would have forced Goldman Sachs to bear the risk of declines in the value of billions of dollars in collateral debt obligations.

Goldman argued that CDSs are marked to market (i.e. valued at their current market price) and their positions netted between counterparties daily. Thus, as the cost of insuring AIG's obligations against default rose substantially in the lead-up to its bailout, the sellers of the CDS contracts had to post more collateral to Goldman Sachs. The firm claims this meant its hedges were effective and the firm would have been protected against an AIG bankruptcy and the risk of knock-on defaults, had AIG been allowed to fail. However, in practice, the collateral would not protect fully against losses both because protection sellers would not be required to post collateral that covered the complete loss during a bankruptcy and because the value of the collateral would be highly uncertain following the repercussions of an AIG bankruptcy. If the government let AIG default, according to money manager Michael Lewitt, "its collapse would be as close to an extinction-level event as the financial markets have seen since the Great Depression".

September 15, 2008 meetings at the New York Federal Reserve 
Some have said, incorrectly according to others, that Goldman Sachs received preferential treatment from the government by being the only Wall Street firm to have participated in the crucial September meetings at the New York Fed, which decided AIG's fate. Much of this has stemmed from an inaccurate but often quoted New York Times article. The article was later corrected to state that Blankfein, CEO of Goldman Sachs, was "one of the Wall Street chief executives at the meeting" (emphasis added). Bloomberg has also reported that representatives from other firms were indeed present at the September AIG meetings. Furthermore, Goldman Sachs CFO David Viniar  stated that CEO Blankfein had never "met" with his predecessor and then-US Treasury Secretary Henry Paulson to discuss AIG; However, there were frequent phone calls between the two of them. Paulson was not present at the September meetings at the New York Fed. Morgan Stanley was hired by the Federal Reserve to advise on the AIG bailout.

According to the New York Times, Paulson spoke with the CEO of Goldman Sachs two dozen times during the week of the bailout, though he obtained an ethics waiver before doing so. While it is common for regulators to be in contact with market participants to gather valuable industry intelligence, particularly in a crisis, the Times noted he spoke with Goldman's Blankfein more frequently than with other large banks. Federal officials say that although Paulson was involved in decisions to rescue A.I.G, it was the Federal Reserve that played the lead role in shaping and financing the A.I.G. bailout.

$60 million settlement for Massachusetts subprime mortgages (2009) 
On May 10, 2009, Goldman Sachs agreed to pay up to $60 million to end an investigation by the Massachusetts attorney general's office into whether the firm helped promote unfair home loans in the state. The settlement will be used to reduce the mortgage payments of 714 Massachusetts residents who had secured subprime mortgages funded by Goldman Sachs. Michael DuVally, a spokesman for Goldman, said it was "pleased to have resolved this matter," and declined to comment further. This settlement may open the door to state government actions against Goldman throughout the United States aimed at securing compensation for predatory mortgage lending practices.

Sale of Dragon Systems to Lernout & Hauspie despite accounting issues 
In 2000, Goldman Sachs advised Dragon Systems on its sale to Lernout & Hauspie of Belgium for $580 million in L&H stock. L&H later collapsed due to accounting fraud and its stock price declined significantly. Jim and Janet Baker, founders and together 50% owners of Dragon, filed a lawsuit against Goldman Sachs, alleging negligence, intentional and negligent misrepresentation, and breach of fiduciary duty since Goldman did not warn Dragon or the Bakers of the accounting problems of the acquirer, L&H. On January 23, 2013 a federal jury rejected the Bakers' claims and found Goldman Sachs not liable to the Bakers.

Stock price manipulation 
Goldman Sachs was charged for repeatedly issuing research reports with extremely inflated financial projections for Exodus Communications and Goldman Sachs was accused of giving Exodus its highest stock rating even though Goldman knew Exodus did not deserve such a rating.

On July 15, 2003, Goldman Sachs, Lehman Brothers and Morgan Stanley were sued for artificially inflating the stock price of RSL Communications by issuing untrue or materially misleading statements in research analyst reports, and paid $3,380,000 for settlement.

Goldman Sachs is accused of asking for kickback bribes from institutional clients who made large profits flipping stocks which Goldman had intentionally undervalued in initial public offerings it was underwriting. Documents under seal in a decade-long lawsuit concerning eToys.com's initial public offering (IPO) in 1999 but released accidentally to the New York Times show that IPOs managed by Goldman were underpriced and that Goldman asked clients able to profit from the prices to increase business with it. The clients willingly complied with these demands because they understood it was necessary in order to participate in further such undervalued IPOs. Companies going public and their initial consumer stockholders are both defrauded by this practice.

So-called 'naked short-selling' – Overstock.com 
In 2015, Goldman settled with Overstock for $20 million for participating in abusive practices described as "creat[ing] fake lendable shares out of thin air" with the end of result of "organized counterfeiting of shares in the market"; crucial evidence of the Goldman's participation in these manipulative practices surfaced when Goldman’s lawyer accidentally posted on PACER, the federal court online filing system, emails from a broker documenting his abuses.

Use of offshore tax havens 
A 2016 report by Citizens for Tax Justice stated that "Goldman Sachs reports having 987 subsidiaries in offshore tax havens, 537 of which are in the Cayman Islands despite not operating a single legitimate office in that country, according to its own website. The group officially holds $28.6 billion offshore." The report also noted several other major U.S. banks and companies use the same tax-avoidance tactics.

In 2008, Goldman Sachs had an effective tax rate of only 3.8%, down from 34% the year before, and its tax liability decreased to $14 million in 2008, compared to $6 billion in 2007. Critics have argued that the reduction in Goldman Sachs's tax rate was achieved by shifting its earnings to subsidiaries in low or no-tax nations, such as the Cayman Islands.

Involvement in the European sovereign debt crisis 

Goldman is being criticized for its involvement in the 2010 European sovereign debt crisis. Goldman Sachs is reported to have systematically helped the Greek government mask the true facts concerning its national debt between the years 1998 and 2009. In September 2009, Goldman Sachs, among others, created a special credit default swap (CDS) index to cover the high risk of Greece's national debt. The interest-rates of Greek national bonds soared, leading the Greek economy very close to bankruptcy in 2010 and 2011.

Ties between Goldman Sachs and European leadership positions were another source of controversy. Lucas Papademos, Greece's former prime minister, ran the Central Bank of Greece at the time of the controversial derivatives deals with Goldman Sachs that enabled Greece to hide the size of its debt. Petros Christodoulou, General Manager of the Greek Public Debt Management Agency is a former employee of Goldman Sachs. Mario Monti, Italy's former prime minister and finance minister, who headed the new government that took over after Berlusconi's resignation, is an international adviser to Goldman Sachs. Otmar Issing, former board member of the Bundesbank and the Executive Board of the European Bank also advised Goldman Sachs. Mario Draghi, head of the European Central Bank, was formerly a Managing Director at Goldman Sachs International. António Borges, Head of the European Department of the International Monetary Fund in 2010–2011 and responsible for most of enterprise privatizations in Portugal since 2011, is the former Vice Chairman of Goldman Sachs International. Carlos Moedas, a former Goldman Sachs employee, was the Secretary of State to the Prime Minister of Portugal and Director of ESAME, the agency created to monitor and control the implementation of the structural reforms agreed by the government of Portugal and the troika composed of the European Commission, the European Central Bank and the International Monetary Fund. Peter Sutherland, former Attorney General of Ireland was a non-executive director of Goldman Sachs International.

Employee's views 
In March 2012, Greg Smith, then-head of Goldman Sachs US equity derivatives sales business in Europe, the Middle East and Africa (EMEA), resigned his position via a critical letter printed as an op-ed in The New York Times. In the letter, he attacked Goldman Sachs CEO and Chairman Lloyd Blankfein for losing touch with the company's culture, which he described as "the secret sauce that made this place great and allowed us to earn our clients' trust for 143 years." Smith said that advising clients "to do what I believe is right for them" was becoming increasingly unpopular. Instead there was a "toxic and destructive" environment in which "the interests of the client continue to be sidelined", senior management described clients as "muppets" and colleagues callously talked about "ripping their clients off". In reply, Goldman Sachs said that "we will only be successful if our clients are successful", claiming "this fundamental truth lies at the heart of how we conduct ourselves" and that "we don't think [Smith's comments] reflect the way we run our business." Later that year, Smith published a book titled Why I left Goldman Sachs.

According to the New York Times own research after the op-ed was printed, almost all the claims made in Smith's incendiary Op-Ed–about Goldman Sachs turned out to be "curiously short" on evidence. The New York Times never issued a retraction or admitted to any error in judgment in initially publishing Smith's op-ed.

In 2014 a book by former Goldman portfolio manager Steven George Mandis was published entitled What Happened to Goldman Sachs: An Insider's Story of Organizational Drift and Its Unintended Consequences. Mandis also has a PhD dissertation about Goldman at Columbia University. Mandis left in 2004 after working for the firm for 12 years. In an interview Mandis said, "You read about Goldman Sachs and it's either the bank is the best or the bank is the worst, this is not one of those books—things are never black or white." According to Mandis, there was an "organizational drift" in the company's evolution.

In 2010, two former female employees filed a lawsuit against Goldman Sachs for gender discrimination. Cristina Chen-Oster and Shanna Orlich claimed that the firm fostered an "uncorrected culture of sexual harassment and assault" causing women to either be "sexualized or ignored". The suit cited both cultural and pay discrimination including frequent client trips to strip clubs, client golf outings that excluded female employees, and the fact that female vice presidents made 21% less than their male counterparts.

Advice to short California bonds underwritten by the firm 
On November 11, 2008, the Los Angeles Times reported that Goldman Sachs had both earned $25 million from underwriting California bonds, and advised other clients to short those bonds. While some journalists criticized the contradictory actions, others pointed out that the opposite investment decisions undertaken by the underwriting side and the trading side of the bank were normal and in line with regulations regarding Chinese walls, and in fact critics had demanded increased independence between underwriting and trading.

Personnel "revolving-door" with US government 
During 2008 Goldman Sachs received criticism for an apparent revolving door relationship, in which its employees and consultants have moved in and out of high level U.S. Government positions, creating the potential for conflicts of interest. The large number of former Goldman Sachs employees in the US government has been jokingly referred to "Government Sachs". Former Treasury Secretary Paulson is a former CEO of Goldman Sachs. Additional controversy attended the selection of former Goldman Sachs lobbyist Mark A. Patterson as chief of staff to Treasury Secretary Timothy Geithner, despite President Barack Obama's campaign promise that he would limit the influence of lobbyists in his administration. In February 2011, the Washington Examiner reported that Goldman Sachs was "the company from which Obama raised the most money in 2008" and that its "CEO Lloyd Blankfein has visited the White House 10 times."

Former New York Fed Chairman's ties to the firm 
Stephen Friedman, a former director of Goldman Sachs, was named Chairman of the Federal Reserve Bank of New York in January 2008. Although he had retired from Goldman in 1994, Friedman continued to own stock in the firm. Goldman's conversion from a securities firm to a bank holding company in September 2008 meant it was now regulated by the Fed and not the SEC. When it became apparent that Timothy Geithner, then president of the New York Fed, would leave his role there to become Treasury Secretary, Friedman was granted a temporary one-year waiver of a rule that forbids "class C" directors of the Fed from direct interest with those it regulates. Friedman agreed to remain on the board until the end of 2009 to provide continuity in the wake of the turmoil caused by Lehman Brothers' bankruptcy. Had the waiver not been granted, the New York Fed would have lost both its president and its chairman (or Friedman would have had to divest his Goldman shares). This would have been highly disruptive for the New York Fed's role in the capital markets. Friedman later said he agreed to stay on the NY Fed board out of a sense of public duty, but that his decision was "being mischaracterized as improper".

Media reports in May 2009 concerning Friedman's involvement with Goldman, and in particular, his purchase of the firm's stock when it traded at historical lows in the fourth quarter of 2008, fueled controversy and criticism over what was seen as a conflict of interest in Friedman's new role as supervisor and regulator to Goldman Sachs. These events prompted his resignation on May 7, 2009. Although Friedman's purchases of Goldman stock did not violate any Fed rule, statute, or policy, he said that the Fed did not need this distraction. He also stated his purchases, made while approval of a waiver was pending, were motivated by a desire to demonstrate confidence in the company during a time of market distress.

Insider trading cases 
In 1986, Goldman Sachs investment banker David Brown pleaded guilty to charges of passing inside information on a takeover deal that eventually was provided to Ivan Boesky. In 1989, Robert M. Freeman, who was a senior Partner, who was the Head of Risk Arbitrage, and who was a protégé of Robert Rubin, pleaded guilty to insider trading, for his own account and for the firm's account.

Rajat Gupta insider trading case 

In April 2010, Goldman director Rajat Gupta was named in an insider-trading case. It was said Gupta had "tipped off a hedge-fund billionaire", Raj Rajaratnam of Galleon Group, about the $5 billion Berkshire Hathaway investment in Goldman during the financial crisis of 2007–2008. According to the report, Gupta had told Goldman the month before his involvement became public that he wouldn't seek re-election as a director. In early 2011, with the delayed Rajaratnam criminal trial about to begin, the United States Securities and Exchange Commission (SEC) announced civil charges against Gupta covering the Berkshire investment as well as confidential quarterly earnings information from Goldman and Procter & Gamble (P&G). Gupta was board member at P&G until voluntarily resigning the day of the SEC announcement, after the charges were announced. "Gupta was an investor in some of the Galleon hedge funds when he passed the information along, and he had other business interests with Rajaratnam that were potentially lucrative.... Rajaratnam used the information from Gupta to illegally profit in hedge fund trades.... The information on Goldman made Rajaratnam's funds $17 million richer.... The Procter & Gamble data created illegal profits of more than $570,000 for Galleon funds managed by others, the SEC said." Gupta was said to have "vigorously denied the SEC accusations". He was also a board member of AMR Corporation.

Gupta was convicted in June 2012 on insider trading charges stemming from Galleon Group case on four criminal felony counts of conspiracy and securities fraud. He was sentenced in October 2012 to two years in prison, an additional year on supervised release and ordered to pay $5 million in fines.

Abacus mortgage-backed CDOs and $550 million settlement (2010) 

Unlike many investors and investment banks, Goldman Sachs anticipated the subprime mortgage crisis that developed in 2007-8. Some of its traders became "bearish" on the housing boom beginning in 2004 and developed mortgage-related securities, originally intended to protect Goldman from investment losses in the housing market. In late 2006, Goldman management changed the firm's overall stance on the mortgage market from positive to negative. As the market began its downturn, Goldman "created even more of these securities", no longer just hedging or satisfying investor orders but, according to business journalist Gretchen Morgenson, "enabling it to pocket huge profits" from the mortgage defaults and that Goldman "used the C.D.O.'s to place unusually large negative bets that were not mainly for hedging purposes". Authors Bethany McLean and Joe Nocera stated that "the firm's later insistence that it was merely a 'market maker' in these transactions—implying that it had no stake in the economic performance of the securities it was selling to clients—became less true over time."

The investments were called synthetic CDOs because unlike regular collateralized debt obligations, the principal and interest they paid out came not from mortgages or other loans, but from premiums to pay for insurance against mortgage defaults—the insurance known as "credit default swaps". Goldman and some other hedge funds held a "short" position in the securities, paying the premiums, while the investors (insurance companies, pension funds, etc.) receiving the premiums were the "long" position. The longs were responsible for paying the insurance "claim" to Goldman and any other shorts if the mortgages or other loans defaulted.

Through April 2007 Goldman issued over 20 CDOs in its "Abacus" series worth a total of $10.9 billion. All together Goldman packaged, sold, and shorted a total of 47 synthetic CDOs, with an aggregate face value of $66 billion between July 1, 2004 and May 31, 2007.

But while Goldman was praised for its foresight, some argued its bets against the securities it created gave it a vested interest in their failure. These securities performed very poorly for the long investors and by April 2010, at least US$5 billion worth of the securities either carried "junk" ratings, or had defaulted. One CDO examined by critics which Goldman bet against, but also sold to investors, was the $800 million Hudson Mezzanine CDO issued in 2006. In the Senate Permanent Subcommittee hearings, Goldman executives stated that the company was trying to remove subprime securities from its books. Unable to sell them directly, it included them in the underlying securities of the CDO and took the short side, but critics McLean and Nocera complained the CDO prospectus did not explain this but described its contents as "'assets sourced from the Street', making it sound as though Goldman randomly selected the securities, instead of specifically creating a hedge for its own book." The CDO did not perform well and by March 2008—just 18 months after its issue—so many borrowers had defaulted that holders of the security paid out "about US$310 million to Goldman and others who had bet against it". Goldman's head of European fixed-income sales lamented in an email made public by the Senate Permanent Subcommittee on Investigations, the "real bad feeling across European sales about some of the trades we did with clients" who had invested in the CDO. "The damage this has done to our franchise is very significant."

Critics also complain that while Goldman's investors were large, ostensibly sophisticated banks and insurers, at least some of the CDO securities and their losses filtered down to small public agencies—"money used to run schools and fix potholes and fund municipal budgets". For example, an investor in Abacus, IKB Bank, "created a structured investment vehicle called Rhinebridge. Rhinebridge, like other SIVs, issued debt that it then used to buy mortgage-backed securities and CDOs like Abacus. The debt issued by Rhinebridge, ... was bought by among others, King County, Washington, which managed money on behalf of one hundred other public agencies. This was money used to run schools and fix potholes and fund municipal budgets . ... For all of Goldman's later claims that it dealt only with the most sophisticated of investors, the fact remained that those investors could be fiduciaries, investing on behalf of school districts, fire departments, pensioners, and municipalities all across the country."

IKB "paid for its share of the deal with money it collected from a number of relatively unsophisticated investors including King County in Washington state. In 2007, the county bought US$100 million of commercial paper, a type of short-term debt, from Rhineland, a special fund created by IKB that in turn snapped up nearly US$150 million of the securities created by the Goldman vehicle known as Abacus 2007-AC1. ... [King County also made a] US$50-million purchase ... in 2007 from another IKB fund, dubbed Rhinebridge. The county lost US$19 million when Rhinebridge collapsed—and an additional US$54 million when other similar funds defaulted. About 100 county agencies in the Seattle area, including some that deal with libraries and schools, saw their budgets cut as a result."

In public statements, Goldman claimed that it shorted simply to hedge and was not expecting the CDOs to fail. It also denied that its investors were unaware of Goldman's bets against the products it was selling to them. There were intricate links between a Goldman Sachs trader, Jonathan M. Egol, synthetic collateralized debt obligations, or C.D.O., ABACUS, and asset-backed securities index (ABX).

Goldman is also alleged to have tried to pressure the credit rating agency Moody's give its products a higher rating than they deserved. According to an article in ProPublica, "Goldman and other firms often seemed to have pressured the agencies to give good ratings. E-mails released last week by the Senate investigations subcommittee give a glimpse of the back-and-forth (PDF). "I am getting serious pushback from Goldman on a deal that they want to go to market with today," wrote one Moody's employee in an internal e-mail message in April 2006. The Senate subcommittee found that rating decisions were often subject to concerns about losing market share to competitors. The agencies are, after all, paid by the firms whose products they rate."

2010 SEC civil fraud lawsuit 
In April 2010, the U.S. Securities and Exchange Commission (SEC) charged Goldman Sachs and one of its vice-presidents, Fabrice Tourre, with securities fraud. The SEC alleged that Goldman had told buyers of a synthetic CDO, a type of investment, that the underlying assets in the investment had been picked by an independent CDO manager, ACA Management. In fact, Paulson & Co. a hedge fund that wanted to bet against the investment had played a "significant role" in the selection, and the package of securities turned out to become "one of the worst-performing mortgage deals of the housing crisis" because "less than a year after the deal was completed, 100% of the bonds selected for Abacus had been downgraded".

The particular synthetic CDO that the SEC's 2010 fraud suit charged Goldman with misleading investors with was called Abacus 2007-AC1. Unlike many of the Abacus securities, 2007-AC1 did not have Goldman Sachs as a short seller, in fact, Goldman Sachs lost money on the deal. That position was taken by the customer (John Paulson) who hired Goldman to issue the security (according to the SEC's complaint). Paulson and his employees selected 90 BBB-rated mortgage bonds that they believed were most likely to lose value and so the best bet to buy insurance for. Paulson and the manager of the CDO, ACA Management, worked on the portfolio of 90 bonds to be insured (ACA allegedly unaware of Paulson's short position), coming to an agreement in late February 2007. Paulson paid Goldman approximately US$15 million for its work in the deal. Paulson ultimately made a US$1 billion profit from the short investments, the profits coming from the losses of the investors and their insurers. These were primarily IKB Deutsche Industriebank (US$150 million loss), and the investors and insurers of another US$900 million—ACA Financial Guaranty Corp, ABN AMRO, and the Royal Bank of Scotland.

The SEC alleged that Goldman "materially misstated and omitted facts in disclosure documents" about the financial security, including the fact that it had "permitted a client that was betting against the mortgage market [the hedge fund manager Paulson & Co.] to heavily influence which mortgage securities to include in an investment portfolio, while telling other investors that the securities were selected by an independent, objective third party," ACA Management. The SEC further alleged that "Tourre also misled ACA into believing ... that Paulson's interests in the collateral section [sic] process were aligned with ACA's, when in reality Paulson's interests were sharply conflicting."

In reply Goldman issued a statement saying the SEC's charges were "unfounded in law and fact", and in later statements maintained that it had not structured the portfolio to lose money, that it had provided extensive disclosure to the long investors in the CDO, that it had lost $90 million, that ACA selected the portfolio without Goldman suggesting Paulson was to be a long investor, that it did not disclose the identities of a buyer to a seller and vice versa as it was not normal business practice for a market maker, and that ACA was itself the largest purchaser of the Abacus pool, investing US$951 million. Goldman also stated that any investor losses resulted from the overall negative performance of the entire sector, rather than from a particular security in the CDO.

While some journalists and analysts have called these statements misleading, others believed Goldman's defense was strong and the SEC's case was weak.

Some experts on securities law such as Duke University law professor James Cox, believed the suit had merit because Goldman was aware of the relevance of Paulson's involvement and took steps to downplay it. Others, including Wayne State University Law School law professor Peter Henning, noted that the major purchasers were sophisticated investors capable of accurately assessing the risks involved, even without knowledge of the part played by Paulson.

Critics of Goldman Sachs point out that Paulson went to Goldman Sachs after being turned down for ethical reasons by another investment bank, Bear Stearns who he had asked to build a CDO. Ira Wagner, the head of Bear Stearns's CDO Group in 2007, told the Financial Crisis Inquiry Commission that having the short investors select the referenced collateral as a serious conflict of interest and the structure of the deal Paulson was proposing encouraged Paulson to pick the worst assets. Describing Bear Stearns's reasoning, one author compared the deal to "a bettor asking a football owner to bench a star quarterback to improve the odds of his wager against the team." Goldman claimed it lost $90 million, critics maintain it was simply unable (not due to a lack of trying) to shed its position before the underlying securities defaulted.

Critics also question whether the deal was ethical, even if it was legal. Goldman had considerable advantages over its long customers. According to McLean and Nocera there were dozens of securities being insured in the CDO—for example, another ABACUS—had 130 credits from several different mortgage originators, commercial mortgage-backed securities, debt from Sallie Mae, credit cards, etc. Goldman bought mortgages to create securities, which made it "far more likely than its clients to have early knowledge" that the housing bubble was deflating and the mortgage originators like New Century had begun to falsify documentation and sell mortgages to customers unable to pay the mortgage-holders back—which is why the fine print on at least one ABACUS prospectus warned long investors that the 'Protection Buyer' (Goldman) 'may have information, including material, non-public information' which it was not providing to the long investors.

According to an article in the Houston Chronicle, critics also worried that Abacus might undermine the position of the US "as a safe harbor for the world's investors" and that "The involvement of European interests as losers in this allegedly fixed game has attracted the attention of that region's political leaders, most notably British Prime Minister Gordon Brown, who has accused Goldman of "moral bankruptcy". This is, in short, a big global story ... Is what Goldman Sachs did with its Abacus investment vehicle illegal? That will be for the courts to decide, ... But it doesn't take a judge and jury to conclude that, legalities aside, this was just wrong."

On July 15, 2010, Goldman settled out of court, agreeing to pay the SEC and investors US$550 million, including $300 million to the U.S. government and $250 million to investors, one of the largest penalties ever paid by a Wall Street firm. In August 2013 Tourre was found liable on 6 of 7 counts by a federal jury. The company did not admit or deny wrongdoing, but did admit that its marketing materials for the investment "contained incomplete information", and agreed to change some of its business practices regarding mortgage investments.

Tourre defense of ABACUS lawsuit 
The 2010 Goldman settlement did not cover charges against Goldman vice president and salesman for ABACUS, Fabrice Tourre.

Tourre unsuccessfully sought a dismissal of the suit, which then went to trial in 2013. On August 1, a federal jury found Tourre liable on six of seven counts, including that he misled investors about the mortgage deal. He was found not liable on the charge that he had deliberately made an untrue or misleading statement.

Alleged commodity price manipulation 

A provision of the 1999 financial deregulation law, the Gramm-Leach-Bliley Act, allows commercial banks to enter into any business activity that is "complementary to a financial activity and does not pose a substantial risk to the safety or soundness of depository institutions or the financial system generally." In the years since the laws passing, Goldman Sach and other investment banks (Morgan Stanley, JPMorgan Chase) have branched out into ownership of a wide variety of enterprises including raw materials, such as food products, zinc, copper, tin, nickel and, aluminum.

Some critics, such as Matt Taibbi, believe that allowing a company to both "control the supply of crucial physical commodities, and also trade in the financial products that might be related to those markets," is "akin to letting casino owners who take book on NFL games during the week also coach all the teams on Sundays."

Unauthorized trades by Goldman Sachs trader Matthew Marshall Taylor 
Former Goldman Sachs trader Matthew Marshall Taylor was convicted of hiding $8.3 billion worth of unauthorized trades involving derivatives on the S&P 500 index by making "multiple false entries" into a Goldman trading system. When Goldman Sachs management uncovered the trades, Taylor was immediately fired. The trades cost the company $118 million, which Taylor was ordered to repay. In 2013, Taylor plead guilty to charges and was sentenced to 9 months in prison in addition to the monetary damages.

Goldman Sachs Commodity Index and the 2005–2008 Food Bubble 
Frederick Kaufman, a contributing editor of Harper's Magazine, argued in a 2010 article that Goldman's creation of the Goldman Sachs Commodity Index (now the S&P GSCI) helped passive investors such as pension funds, mutual funds and others engage in food price Speculation by betting on financial products based on the commodity index. These financial products disturbed the normal relationship between supply and demand, making prices more volatile and defeating the price stabilization mechanism of the futures exchange.

A June 2010 article in The Economist defended commodity investors and oil index-tracking funds, citing a report by the Organisation for Economic Co-operation and Development that found that commodities without futures markets and ignored by index-tracking funds also saw price rises during the period.

Aluminum price and supply 
In a July 2013 article, David Kocieniewski, a journalist with The New York Times accused Goldman Sachs and other Wall Street firms of "capitalizing on loosened federal regulations" to manipulate "a variety of commodities markets", particularly aluminum, citing "financial records, regulatory documents and interviews with people involved in the activities." After Goldman Sachs purchased aluminum warehousing company Metro International in 2010, the wait of warehouse customers for delivery of aluminum supplies to their factories—to make beer cans, home siding and other products—went from an average of 6 weeks to more than 16 months, "according to industry records." "Aluminum industry analysts say that the lengthy delays at Metro International after Goldman took over are a major reason the premium on all aluminum sold in the spot market has doubled since 2010." The price increase has cost "American consumers more than $5 billion" from 2010 to 2013 according to former industry executives, analysts and consultants. The cause of this was alleged to be Goldman's ownership of a quarter of the national supply of aluminum—a million and a half tons—in network of 27 Metro International warehouses Goldman owns in Detroit, Michigan. To avoid hoarding and price manipulation, the London Metal Exchange requires that "at least 3,000 tons of that metal must be moved out each day". Goldman has dealt with this requirement by moving the aluminum—not to factories, but "from one warehouse to another"—according to the Times.

In August 2013, Goldman Sachs was subpoenaed by the federal Commodity Futures Trading Commission as part of an investigation into complaints that Goldman-owned metals warehouses had "intentionally created delays and inflated the price of aluminum." In December 2013, it was announced that 26 cases accusing Goldman Sachs and JPMorgan Chase, the two investment banks' warehousing businesses, and the London Metal Exchange in various combinations—of violating U.S. antitrust laws, would be assigned to United States District Court for the Southern District of New York Judge Katherine B. Forrest in Manhattan.

According to Lydia DePillis of Wonkblog, when Goldman bought the warehouses it "started paying traders extra to bring their metal" to Goldman's warehouses "rather than anywhere else. The longer it stays, the more rent Goldman can charge, which is then passed on to the buyer in the form of a premium." The effect is "amplified" by another company, Glencore, which is "doing the same thing in its warehouse in Vlissingen".

Michael DuVally, a spokesman for Goldman Sachs, said the cases are without merit. Robert Lenzner, a columnist at Forbes, wrote that Goldman Sachs controls only 3% of the global market and is therefore too small to have pricing power. An article published by Bloomberg L.P. also debunked the conspiracy theory.

In December 2014, Goldman Sachs sold its aluminum warehousing business to Ruben Brothers.

Oil futures speculation 
Investment banks, including Goldman, have also been accused of driving up the price of gasoline by speculating on the oil futures exchange. In August 2011, "confidential documents" were leaked "detailing the positions" in the oil futures market of several investment banks, including Goldman Sachs, Morgan Stanley, JPMorgan Chase, Deutsche Bank, and Barclays, just before the peak in gasoline prices in the summer of 2008. The presence of positions by investment banks on the market was significant for the fact that the banks have deep pockets, and so the means to significantly sway prices, and unlike traditional market participants, neither produced oil nor ever took physical possession of actual barrels of oil they bought and sold. Journalist Kate Sheppard of Mother Jones called it "a development that many say is artificially raising the price of crude". However, another source stated that "Just before crude oil hit its record high in mid-2008, 15 of the world's largest banks were betting that prices would fall, according to private trading data...."

In April 2011, a couple of observers—Brad Johnson of the blog Climate Progress, founded by Joseph J. Romm, and Alain Sherter of CBS MoneyWatch—noted that Goldman Sachs was warning investors of a dangerous spike in the price of oil. Climate Progress quoted Goldman as warning "that the price of oil has grown out of control due to excessive speculation" in petroleum futures, and that "net speculative positions are four times as high as in June 2008." when the price of oil peaked.

It stated that "Goldman Sachs told its clients that it believed speculators like itself had artificially driven the price of oil at least $20 higher than supply and demand dictate." Sherter noted that Goldman's concern over speculation did not prevent it (along with other speculators) from lobbying against regulations by the Commodity Futures Trading Commission to establish "position limits", which would cap the number of futures contracts a trader can hold, and thus prevent speculation.

According to Joseph P. Kennedy II, by 2012, prices on the oil commodity market had become influenced by "hedge funds and bankers" pumping "billions of purely speculative dollars into commodity exchanges, chasing a limited number of barrels and driving up the price". The problem started, according to Kennedy, in 1991, when just a few years after oil futures began trading on the New York Mercantile Exchange, Goldman Sachs made an argument to the Commodity Futures Trading Commission that Wall Street dealers who put down big bets on oil should be considered legitimate hedgers and granted an exemption from regulatory limits on their trades.
The commission granted an exemption that ultimately allowed Goldman Sachs to process billions of dollars in speculative oil trades. Other exemptions followed and "by 2008, eight investment banks accounted for 32% of the total oil futures market."

Danish utility sale (2014) 
Goldman Sachs's purchase of an 18% stake in state-owned DONG EnergyDenmark's largest electric utilityset off a "political crisis" in Denmark. The sale—approved on January 30, 2014—sparked protest in the form of the resignation of six cabinet ministers and the withdrawal of a party (Socialist People's Party) from Prime Minister Helle Thorning-Schmidt's leftist governing coalition. According to Bloomberg Businessweek, "the role of Goldman in the deal struck a nerve with the Danish public, which is still suffering from the aftereffects of the global financial crisis." Protesters in Copenhagen gathered around a banner "with a drawing of a vampire squid—the description of Goldman used by Matt Taibbi in Rolling Stone in 2009". Opponents expressed concern that Goldman would have some say in Dong's management, and that Goldman planned to manage its investment through "subsidiaries in Luxembourg, the Cayman Islands, and Delaware, which made Danes suspicious that the bank would shift earnings to tax havens." Goldman purchased the 18% stake in 2014 for 8 billion kroner and sold just over a 6% stake in 2017 for 6.5 billion kroner.

Libya investment losses (2013) 
In January 2014, the Libyan Investment Authority (LIA) filed a lawsuit against Goldman for $1 billion after the firm lost 98% of the $1.3 billion the LIA invested with Goldman in 2007.

Goldman made more than $1 billion in derivatives trades with the LIA funds, which lost almost all their value but earned Goldman $350 million in profit. In court documents firm has admitted to having used small gifts, occasional travel and an internship in order to gain access to Libya's sovereign wealth fund.

In August 2014, Goldman dropped a bid to end the suit in a London court. In October 2016, after trial, the court entered a judgment in Goldman Sachs's favor.

Improper securities lending practices 
In January 2016, Goldman Sachs agreed to pay $15 million after it was found that a team of Goldman employees, between 2008 and 2013, "granted locates" by arranging to borrow securities to settle short sales without adequate review. However, U.S. regulation for short selling requires brokerages to enter an agreement to borrow securities on behalf of customers or to have "reasonable grounds" for believing that it can borrow the security before entering contracts to complete the sale. Additionally, Goldman Sachs gave "incomplete and unclear" responses to information requests from SEC compliance examiners in 2013 about the firm's securities lending practices.

1MDB Malaysian sovereign wealth fund scandal (2015–) 

According to the Thomson Reuters league tables, Goldman Sachs was the most successful foreign investment bank in Malaysia from 2011 to 2013. In 2013, the bank had a 21% market share in Malaysia's investment banking segment, double that of its nearest rival, mostly due to business with the Malaysian sovereign wealth fund, 1Malaysia Development Berhad (1MDB).

In 2015, U.S. prosecutors began examining the role of Goldman Sachs in helping 1MDB raise more than $6 billion. The 1MDB bond deals are said to generate "above-average" commission and fees for Goldman Sachs amounting close to $600 million or more than 9% of the proceeds.

Beginning in 2016, Goldman Sachs was investigated for a $3 billion bond created by Goldman for 1MDB. Prosecutors investigated if the bank failed to comply with the U.S. Bank Secrecy Act, which requires financial institutions to report suspicious transactions to regulators.

Goldman Sans font 

In June 2020, Goldman Sachs introduced a new corporate typeface, Goldman Sans, and made it freely available. After Internet users discovered that the terms of the license prohibited the disparagement of Goldman Sachs, the bank was much mocked and disparaged in its own font, until it eventually changed the license to the standard SIL Open Font License.

References 

Goldman Sachs
Corporate scandals